Abington High School is a public high school co-located with middle and pre-kindergarten schools in Abington, Massachusetts, United States. 
It is located at 201 Gliniewicz Way and has an enrollment of 520 students. The school's mascot is the Green Wave and the school colors are Green and White. Abington High School is known for its football program, which has won 5 state titles and 8 league championships since 2002.

Athletics

Football

The football team has won 5 State Championships (2002, 2005, 2012, 2014, 2019). They have also won 11 South Shore League Championships in 1975, 1981, 2002, 2005, 2006, 2007, 2008, 2009, 2012, and 2013, 2019. They have also had three undefeated teams in 2006, 2008, and 2012.

Abington set a Southeastern Massachusetts record for football attendance on November 14, 2008, in game against rival Mashpee High School. Both teams entered the game undefeated at 9–0 and ranked in the state Top 25 polls, as the South Shore League title and a playoff berth were on the line. Abington prevailed 14–6 and went on to complete an undefeated regular season. The attendance of the game was recorded at 7,109.

Football Accomplishments
 State Champions - 2002, 2005, 2012, 2014, 2019
 League Champions - 1975, 1981, 2002, 2005, 2006, 2007, 2008, 2009, 2012, 2013, 2019
 Eastern Mass South Sectional Champions - 2013, 2014, 2019

Other sports

Abington's baseball team won the Division 3 State Championship in 2009.

The girls' basketball team won the Division 2 State Championship in 1981.

Notable alumni
 Max Barsky (born 1991), professional wrestler best known by his ring name David Starr
 Gary Lee Sampson, carjacker and serial killer
 Craig Sheppard, concert pianist and silver medalist of the Leeds International Piano Competition
 Mike Hazen, (born 1976), Boston Red Sox GM, Arizona Diamondbacks Executive VP and GM

References

Public high schools in Massachusetts
Abington, Massachusetts
Schools in Plymouth County, Massachusetts
1906 establishments in Massachusetts